The Larsen-Noyes House is a historic house in Ephraim, Utah. It was built in 1897 by Albert Johnson, an immigrant from Norway, for H. P. Larsen, an immigrant from Denmark. It was later purchased by Newton Eugene Noyes, the president of Sanpete Stake Academy, later known as Snow College, for 29 years. It has been listed on the National Register of Historic Places since December 1, 1978.

References

National Register of Historic Places in Sanpete County, Utah
Gothic Revival architecture in Utah
Houses completed in 1897
Snow College
1897 establishments in Utah